La Bachellerie is a former railway station in La Bachellerie, Nouvelle-Aquitaine, France. The station is located on the Coutras - Tulle railway line. The station is served by TER Nouvelle-Aquitaine bus services on demand to Thenon and Condat-Le Lardin. Train services were suspended in 2020.

References

Railway stations in France opened in 1860
Defunct railway stations in Dordogne